The Long Mountain transmitting station is sited on a  ridge about  east of Welshpool in Powys, Mid Wales and has been broadcasting UHF terrestrial TV and VHF FM radio services since the late 1970s. The site has a self-supporting 170' (52 metre) high lattice steel mast and was fed with an SHF link from Blaenplwyf via Llangurig. Despite not taking its signal off-air, it was originally classed as a 625-line UHF TV relay of Blaenplwyf.

The transmitter originally radiated 1 kW providing TV and radio to an area including Newtown and Oswestry. Being only  from the England/Wales border, coverage extended to several towns in England – Shrewsbury included.

Long Mountain became re-classed as main transmitter in its own right (albeit a very low power one) with the advent of digital terrestrial TV from the site on 4 November 2009. In addition to this, it currently transmits FM radio and a single multiplex of DAB Digital radio.

Services available

Analogue television

17 September 1976 - 1 November 1982
Long Mountain never did broadcast VHF television, and went live with the UK's original three national UHF television services.

1 November 1982 - 4 November 2009
The UK's fourth national television service joined the set transmitted from the site. Being in Wales, the S4C variant was broadcast.

Analogue and digital television

4 November 2009 - 3 December 2009
The UK's digital switchover commenced at this site. Analogue BBC Two Wales closed on channel 64 and ITV1 Wales took over on that frequency for what would be its final 3 weeks of service, vacating channel 61 as it did so. The new BBC A multiplex started up at full power in 64-QAM mode on channel 60 until 19 October 2011.

Digital television

3 December 2009 - 19 October 2011
All the analogue television services closed and the new digital multiplexes took over on parking-frequencies (until October 2011) with name-changes, power increases and a shift to 64-QAM. Unusually, for a digital TV site classed as a main transmitter, Long Mountain only radiates the three public service multiplexes of Freeview.

19 October 2011 - present
DSO was completed at The Wrekin, and this allowed the Long Mountain multiplexes to take up their final frequencies.

Analogue radio (VHF FM)
For its FM radio services, Long Mountain is an off-air relay of Llangollen.

Digital radio (DAB)

References

External links
MB21's entry for the site

Transmitter sites in Wales